East of England was a constituency of the European Parliament that was coterminous with the East of England region. It returned 7 MEPs using the D'Hondt method of party-list proportional representation, until the UK exit from the European Union on 31 January 2020.

Boundaries 
The constituency corresponded to the East of England region of the United Kingdom, comprising the ceremonial counties of Bedfordshire, Cambridgeshire, Essex, Hertfordshire, Norfolk and Suffolk.

History 
It was formed as a result of the European Parliamentary Elections Act 1999, replacing a number of single-member constituencies. At the time of their abolition in 1999, these were Cambridgeshire, Essex North and Suffolk South, Essex South, Essex West and Hertfordshire East, Hertfordshire, Norfolk, Suffolk and South West Norfolk, and parts of Bedfordshire and Milton Keynes.

Returned members

Election results 

Elected candidates are shown in bold. Brackets indicate the number of votes per seat won.

2019

2014

2009

2004

1999

References 

European Parliament constituencies in England (1999–2020)
Politics of the East of England
1999 establishments in England
Constituencies established in 1999
Constituencies disestablished in 2020